The P. League+ (stylized as P. LEAGUE+, abbreviated as PLG), pronounced as Plus League, is a Taiwanese men's professional basketball league founded in 2020.

History 
The P. League+ was founded by Blackie Chen in 2020. It is the first fully professional basketball league in Taiwan after the Chinese Basketball Alliance (CBA) ceased operations in 2000. The first four teams participating in the inaugural season are the Formosa Taishin Dreamers, the Hsinchu JKO Lioneers, the Taipei Fubon Braves, and the Taoyuan Pilots. In its second season 2021–22, the P. League+ added two more teams, the New Taipei Kings and the Kaohsiung Steelers.

Teams

Regular season 
Each team is allowed to have on their roster 16 local players (from which two can either be both overseas Chinese players or a foreign student and an overseas Chinese player) and 3 foreign players.Until to second season only two foreign players can play per game, and only one foreign player can play in the fourth quarter.
Each team plays 40 games, 20 each for home and away. Games are scheduled mainly on weekends and national holidays.

Playoffs 
The second seed plays the third seed in a best-of-five playoff series, which is played in the 2-2-1 format. The winner of the playoffs plays the first seed in a best-of-seven finals series, which is played in the 2-2-1-1-1 format.

Champions

Ticket prices and viewership demographics

Notable people

Player 

 Lin Chih-chieh
 Yang Chin-min
 Tien Lei
 Tseng Wen-ting
 Quincy Davis
 Jet Chang
 Jeremy Lin
 Joseph Lin
 Davon Reed
 Julian Wright
 Hasheem Thabeet
 Branden Dawson
 Anthony Bennett

Individual awards

Finals MVP

See also
Chinese Basketball Alliance (CBA)
Chinese Taipei men's national basketball team
List of basketball leagues
Sport in Taiwan
Super Basketball League (SBL)
T1 League
Women's Super Basketball League (WSBL)

Notes

References

External links 
 

P. League+
Professional sports leagues in Taiwan
Basketball leagues in Taiwan
2020 establishments in Taiwan
Sports leagues established in 2020